"More Love" is a 1967 hit single recorded by the American soul group The Miracles for Motown Records' Tamla label. The single, included on the group's 1967 album Make It Happen, later reissued in 1970 as The Tears of a Clown.  Kim Carnes's 1980 cover of the song reached the Top 10 of Billboards Adult Contemporary and Hot 100 charts.

The Miracles' original version
This song's origins are born from real-life heartbreak and personal tragedy. Miracles lead singer Smokey Robinson wrote, produced, and sings lead on "More Love", which he considers one of his most personal compositions. Robinson wrote the song for his wife, Miracles member Claudette Rogers Robinson. Claudette had been a member of the Miracles since 1957, but retired from touring in 1964 after a series of miscarriages. She had a total of 8 miscarriages, which forced her off the road, never to tour with The Miracles again, though she continued to record with them as a non-touring member. On one occasion, the Robinsons had a set of twins that were stillborn. According to Smokey Robinson:

After she had a miscarriage [Claudette] would always tell me she was sorry she had let me down. I would explain that she had not let me down because she was there, she was alive; I wanted the babies, but I didn't know them. I wrote 'More Love' to let her know how I felt about her. 

Unlike most other Miracles songs, the track for "More Love" was recorded by Los Angeles session musicians, instead of in Detroit, Michigan by Motown session band The Funk Brothers and Miracles guitarist Marv Tarplin.

Smokey and Claudette Robinson would eventually have two healthy babies, both named after aspects of the Motown corporation: a boy named Berry (after Motown founder Berry Gordy, Jr.) and a girl, Tamla, after the Miracles' record label, Tamla (the Motown Records' subsidiary label for which The Miracles recorded).

Cash Box called it "a feelingful, building romancer...that should appeal to thousands of teen-age listeners."

"More Love" peaked at number 23 on the Billboard Hot 100 and number 19 on the Cash Box Top 100 in the United States, and was a Top 10 Billboard R&B hit, peaking at number five. Although not quite reaching the Pop Top 10 nationally, it was a regional smash, reaching #1 on the Cleveland Ohio Pop Charts for the week of August 11, 1967. The song's "B" side, "Swept For You Baby", was also a popular regional hit, and has inspired cover versions by The Sylvers, The Blenders, and The Tamlins (as "Sweat For You Baby"). In Canada, however, The Miracles' "More Love" became a Top 10 Pop hit, reaching number 8, charting higher than Kim Carnes' subsequent cover version in that country on the Pop and Adult Contemporary charts (#3) years later.

Chart performance

Weekly charts

Year-end charts

Personnel

The Miracles

Smokey Robinson – lead vocals
Claudette Rogers Robinson – background vocals
Ronnie White – background vocals
Bobby Rogers – background vocals
Pete Moore – background vocals 
Assorted Los Angeles studio musicians – instrumentation

Kim Carnes version

The most successful recording of "More Love" was a 1980 version by American singer Kim Carnes, included on her fifth studio album Romance Dance (1980). Carnes' version of "More Love" peaked at number ten on the Billboard Hot 100, spent two weeks at number nine on the Cash Box Top 100 and reached number six on Billboard's Adult Contemporary chart. A Spanish-language version of the song, "Más Amor", was also recorded and released in some territories in Latin America. The single was the first top-ten solo hit for Carnes, formerly of The New Christy Minstrels. Despite "More Love" being a success, the follow-up, "Cry Like a Baby", would miss the Top 40, peaking at number 44. This song would be Carnes' biggest solo hit until "Bette Davis Eyes" in 1981.

Chart performance

Weekly charts

Year-end charts

References

External links
 
 
 "More Love" song review by Joel Francis
 List of cover versions of "More Love" at SecondHandSongs.com

The Miracles songs
Songs written by Smokey Robinson
Tamla Records singles
1967 singles
1980 singles
Kim Carnes songs
Song recordings produced by Smokey Robinson
1967 songs
EMI Records singles
Songs based on actual events
Songs inspired by deaths